Jemima Parry-Jones  (née Glasier; born 6 March 1949) is a British authority on birds of prey (raptors), a conservationist, author, raptor breeder, lecturer, consultant and is the Director of the International Centre for Birds of Prey.

She is the daughter of Phillip Glasier.  In 1967 her father started the first specialist collection of birds of prey in the UK.  The Falconry Centre, as it was known then, now the International Centre for Birds of Prey is 50 years old this year.  It leads the world in the number of raptor species bred in captivity, educates thousands of people every year, works in the rehabilitation field both in the UK and abroad, works with universities on useful and non-invasive research and importantly shares its raptor knowledge and experience for conservation projects worldwide.

The bulk of the off-site conservation work is now with Vultures which have been recently listed as one of the most endangered groups of birds in the world. She with Centre staff are working in India, Nepal, Bangladesh, Bulgaria and South Africa, all on vulture conservation.

Jemima has written seven books, co-authored various scientific papers and assisted in the research for many more.

In June 1999 she was appointed an MBE in the Queen's Birthday honours list for services to bird conservation.

Conference and scientific papers
 Husbandry Guidelines for 'in range' conservation breeding programmes of Gyps bengalensis, Gyps indicus and Gyps tenuirostris. Prakash, V., C. Bowden, R. Cuthbert, N. Lindsay, N. Prakash, A. Routh, J. Parry-Jones. 2012. Version 1.0 pp, 54. Royal Society for Protection of Birds, Sandy, UK: 
 Conservation breeding for the future release of the critically endangered Asian Gyps vultures – Progress of the programme in South Asia and why it is so important Bowden, C., V. Prakash, S. Ranade, A. Routh, R.D. Jakati, R.J. Cuthbert, A.R. Rahmani, R.E. Green, N. Prakash and J. Parry-Jones. 2012. Journal of the Bombay Natural History Society, 109(1 & 2), Jan–Aug 2012.
 2008: The race to prevent the extinction of South Asian vultures. Pain, Bowden, Cunningham, Cuthbert, Das, Gilbert, Jakati, Jhala, Khan, Naidoo, Oaks, Parry-Jones, Prakash, Rahmani, Ranade, Sagar Baral, Ram Senscha, Saravanan, Shah, Swan, Swarup, Taggart, Watson, Virani, Wolter, and R Green.
 2008: Bird Conservation International (2008) 18:S30–S48. _ BirdLife International 2008  Printed in the United Kingdom.
 2006: NSAIDS and Scavenging Birds: potential impacts beyond Asia's Critically Endangered Vultures. Cuthbert, Parry-Jones, Green, Pain. Biology Letters.
 2006: Toxicity of diclofenac to Gyps Vultures. Gerry E. Swan, Richard Cuthbert, Miguel Quevedo, Rhys E. Green, Deborah J. Pain, Paul Bartels, Andrew A. Cunningham, Neil Duncan, Andrew A. Meharg, J. Lindsay Oaks, Jemima Parry-Jones, Susanne Shultz, Mark A. Taggart, Gerhard Verdoorn, Kerri Wolter (2006) Biology Letters, 2: 279–282. .
 2003: Causes and Effects of Temporospatial Declines of Gyps Vultures in Asia. D. J. Pain, A.A. Cunningham, P. F. Donald, .J.W. Duckworth, D. C. Houston, T. Katzner, J. Parry-Jones, C. Poole, V. Prakash, P. Round, R. Timmins Conservation Biology Volume 17, No. 3, June 2003
 2001: The Parsi's and the vulture crisis. RRF's Fourth International Conference on Raptors. Seville, Spain.
 1996: Sustained Captive Breeding. RRF's International Conference on Raptors. University of Urbino, Italy.
 1996: Overview of Raptor Rehabilitation in UK. RRF's International Conference on Raptors. University of Urbino, Italy.
 1993: Human conflicts with raptors. First European Conference of the Raptor Research Foundation. University of Kent.
 1991: Breeding African Pygmy Falcons in Captivity. The Small Falcon Conference. Hawk and Owl Trust University of Kent.
 1990: Breeding Birds of Prey in View of the Public. Raptor Research Foundation Conference. Allan Town Pennsylvania USA.
 1989: The Ethics of Raptor Rehabilitation Rehabilitation Conference. The Hawk and Owl Trust. London Zoo.
 1988: Basic Incubation and Rearing. The Goshawk Workshop The Hawk Board Birmingham University.
 1985: Managed Production of Captive Birds of Prey. Captive Breeding Conference Bristol University.

Video and DVD presentations 
 1989 Understanding Falconry. Written and presented by Parry-Jones, J. Directed by William Clarke WCP Videos, Leics.
 1990 Captive Breeding. Written and presented by Parry-Jones, J. Directed by Barry Eyre WCP Videos, Leics.
 1990 Owls. Written and presented by Parry-Jones, J. Directed by Barry Eyre WCP Videos, Leics.

Publications 
 2012:  Husbandry Guidelines for 'in range' conservation breeding programmes of Gyps bengalensis, Gyps indicus and Gyps tenuirostris. Co-author Dr Vibhu Prakash, Chris Bowden, Richard Cuthbert, Nick Lindsay, Nikita Prakash, Andrew Routh, Jemima Parry-Jones. Published RSPB.
 2008: BSAVA Manual of Raptors, Pigeons and Passerine Birds. Contributor Jemima Parry-Jones MBE. Editors John Chitty, Michael Leirz, British Small Animal Veterinary Association UK.
 2007: Raptor Research & Management Techniques. Editors David M Bird, Keith L. Bildstein. Contributor Jemima Parry-Jones MBE. Hancock House Publishers USA.
 2004: Management and Welfare Guidelines for Strigiformes. Parry-Jones. J. Federation of Zoos, London.
 2004: Grzimek's Animal Life Encyclopedia. Contributor Jemima Parry-Jones MBE. Gale Group.
 2001: Animal. Burnie, David. Contributor Jemima Parry-Jones MBE Dorling Kindersley.
 1999: Birds of Prey Kerrod, Robin Consultant. Jemima Parry-Jones MBE. Lonrenze Books, USA.
 1999: The Really Useful Owl Guide. Parry-Jones, J. TFH Kingdom Books.
 1999: Management and Welfare Guidelines for Falconiformes. Parry-Jones, J. Federation of Zoos, London.
 1998: Understanding Owls. Parry-Jones. David and Charles, Newton Abbot.
 1997: Eye Witness Eagle. Parry-Jones. Dorling Kindersley, London.
 1996: Management Guidelines for Flying Demonstration Birds Parry-Jones. Federation of Zoos, London.
 1994: Training Birds of Prey Parry-Jones. David and Charles, Newton Abbot.
 1993: Breeding African Pygmy Falcons in Captivity Parry-Jones. Nicholls M K and Clarke R (Eds.)
 1990: Amazing Birds of Prey Parry-Jones, J Dorling Kindersley, London.
 1989: Birds of Prey Parry-Jones. National Birds of Prey Centre, Newent.
 1987: Falconry, Care Captive Breeding and Conservation Parry-Jones, J David and Charles Newton Abbot.
 1988: Basic Incubation and Rearing Parry-Jones.
 1988: The Goshawk Workshop. Parry-Jones.(Ed). Proceedings of the Hawk Board Conference, Birmingham University.
 1985: Managed Production of Captive Birds of Prey Parry-Jones. Hill, D (Ed) Proceedings of Captive Breeding Conference, Bristol University.

Consultancies 
 Advising the Police, DEFRA, RSPB, RSPCA CPS and Wildlife Liaison Officers in cases pertaining to the Wildlife and Countryside Act (1981); Import Export (Endangered Species) Act (1975); Cruelty to Animals Act (1911)
 Appearances in Court and or providing expert witness statements for Police in cases involving the Wildlife and Countryside Act (1981); Import Export (Endangered Species) Act (1975); Cruelty to Animals Act (1911)
 Assisting the CITES team at Heathrow to develop a computer software identification program (The Green Parrot Project) to be used to identify endangered raptors being imported, legally or otherwise.
 Signatory of IUCN Conservation and Action Management Plan for Falconiformes.  Worked on Taxon Data Sheets, and produced a worldwide survey on all captive birds of prey.  Articles on Captive Breeding, as part of a working document

References

External links
 International Centre for Birds of Prey

Living people
1949 births
Alumni of the Guildford School of Acting
Alumni of the Royal Academy of Music
British ornithologists
Women ornithologists
British science writers
Members of the Order of the British Empire
Falconry